The ceremonial county of Lancashire, which includes the unitary authorities of 
Blackburn with Darwen and Blackpool,
is divided into sixteen parliamentary constituencies
- eight borough constituencies
and eight county constituencies.

Constituencies

2010 boundary changes

Under the Fifth Periodic Review of Westminster constituencies, the Boundary Commission for England decided to increase Lancashire's representation from 15 to 16 constituencies, with the creation of Wyre and Preston North CC. Lancaster and Wyre was reconfigured and became Lancaster and Fleetwood, and Blackpool North and Fleetwood became Blackpool North and Cleveleys. Other changes were made to realign constituency boundaries with the boundaries of current local government wards, and to reduce the electoral disparity between constituencies.

Proposed boundary changes 
See 2023 Periodic Review of Westminster constituencies for further details

Following the abandonment of the Sixth Periodic Review (the 2018 review), the Boundary Commission for England formally launched the 2023 Review on 5 January 2021. Initial proposals were published on 8 June 2021 and, following two periods of public consultation, revised proposals were published on 8 November 2022. Final proposals will be published by 1 July 2023.

The commission has proposed that Lancashire be combined with Cumbria as a sub-region of the North West Region, with the existing seat of Morecambe and Lonsdale extending into southern Cumbria to create a cross-county boundary constituency. Wyre and Preston North would be abolished, with its contents being distributed to five neighbouring constituencies. As a consequence, Lancaster and Fleetwood, and Blackpool North and Cleveleys would revert back to the previous names of Lancaster and Wyre, and Blackpool North and Fleetwood respectively. Other proposed changes include the expansion of Pendle to become Pendle and Clitheroe. Four wards in the borough of West Lancashire would be included in the Merseyside constituency of Southport.

The following constituencies are proposed:

Containing electoral wards from Blackburn with Darwen
Blackburn
Rossendale and Darwen (part)
Containing electoral wards from Blackpool
Blackpool North and Fleetwood (part)
Blackpool South
Containing electoral wards from Burnley
Burnley (part)
Containing electoral wards from Chorley
Chorley
South Ribble (part)
Containing electoral wards from Fylde

 Fylde (part)

Containing electoral wards from Hyndburn
Hyndburn (part)
Containing electoral wards from Lancaster
Lancaster and Wyre (part)
Morecambe and Lonsdale (part also in District of South Lakeland in Cumbria)
Containing electoral wards from Pendle

 Burnley (part)

Pendle and Clitheroe (part)
Containing electoral wards from Preston
Preston
Ribble Valley (part)
Containing electoral wards from Ribble Valley

 Pendle and Clitheroe (part)

 Ribble Valley (part)

Containing electoral wards from Rossendale

 Hyndburn (part)
 Rossendale and Darwen (part)

Containing electoral wards from South Ribble
Ribble Valley (part)
South Ribble (part)
Containing electoral wards from West Lancashire

 Southport (part also in the Merseyside borough of Sefton)
West Lancashire
Containing electoral wards from Wyre

 Blackpool North and Fleetwood (part)
 Fylde (part)
 Lancaster and Wyre (part)

Results history
Primary data source: House of Commons research briefing - General election results from 1918 to 2019

2019 
The number of votes cast for each political party who fielded candidates in constituencies comprising Lancashire in the 2019 general election were as follows:

1Includes The Speaker, Lyndsay Hoyle, standing in Chorley

Percentage votes 

11983 & 1987 - SDP-Liberal Alliance

2Standing in Chorley, unopposed by the 3 main parties.

* Included in Other

Seats 

11983 & 1987 - SDP-Liberal Alliance

2Lindsay Hoyle

Maps

1950-1979

1983-present

Historical representation by party
A cell marked → (with a different colour background to the preceding cell) indicates that the previous MP continued to sit under a new party name.

1885 to 1918

Lancashire area

Manchester area

Merseyside area

1918 to 1950

Lancashire area

Manchester area

Merseyside area

1950 to 1983

Lancashire area

Manchester area

Merseyside area

1983 to present

See also
 List of parliamentary constituencies in the North West (region)
 List of United Kingdom Parliament constituencies
 2005 UK general election results in Lancashire
 2010 United Kingdom general election result in Lancashire

Notes

References

Lancashire
Politics of Lancashire
Parliamentary Constituencies